The 2008 Vermont gubernatorial election took place on November 4. Incumbent Republican Governor Jim Douglas won re-election to a fourth term. The gubernatorial primary took place on September 9, 2008.

Dates and deadlines
 July 21, 2008—filing (for major parties)
 September 9, 2008—primary election
 September 12, 2008—filing (for third parties)
 October 29, 2008—voter registration deadline for general election
 November 4, 2008—general election

General election

Predictions

Polling

Governor

Lieutenant governor

See also
 2008 United States presidential election in Vermont

References

External links
Elections & Campaign Finance Division from the Vermont Secretary of State
Vermont Governor candidates at Project Vote Smart
Vermont Governor race from OurCampaigns.com
Vermont Governor race from 2008 Race Tracker
Campaign contributions from Follow the Money
Official campaign websites (archived):
Jim Douglas, Republican incumbent candidate
Anthony Pollina, Independent candidate
Gaye Symington, Democratic candidate
Sam Young, Independent candidate

2008
2008 United States gubernatorial elections

Gubernatorial